Athryilatus (Greek:Αθρυίλατος) (1st – 2nd century AD) a Greek physician from Thasos, Macedonia (Roman province).
According to Plutarch's Symposiacs, Athryilatus considered women warmer than men; saying 
Women endure cold better than men, they are not so sensible of the sharpness of the weather, and are contented with a few clothes.

References
Ancient Library
Symposiacs, by Plutarch (chapter3)

1st-century Greek physicians
2nd-century Greek physicians
Roman-era Macedonians